The San Diego Asian Film Festival (SDAFF) is an annual event organized by Pacific Arts Movement (formerly the San Diego Asian Film Foundation) that takes place every November in San Diego, California.

Background

SDAFF is the flagship event for the non-profit organization Pacific Arts Movement (Pac-Arts, formerly the San Diego Asian Film Foundation), which also puts on several other arts and culture events throughout the year. The mission of Pacific Arts Movement is to present Pan Asian media arts to San Diego residents and visitors in order to inspire, entertain and support a more compassionate society. Throughout the year, Pacific Arts Movement offers student internships, cultural literacy programs with local high schools and colleges, and a high school filmmaker project entitled “Reel Voices.” Pacific Arts Movement also teams up with several movie production and marketing companies to promote both independent and mainstream films that are inline with the mission of the organization.

History

SDAFF found its inception in August 2000 when it was first organized as a fundraiser by the Asian American Journalists Association. After receiving numerous film entries, both domestically and internationally, and seeing sold out crowds at its inaugural festival, Lee Ann Kim, the founding director, saw the potential of making SDAFF an organizational entity of its own. Kim teamed up with several journalists, writers, filmmakers, and community leaders to turn the film festival into the larger non-profit organization that Pacific Arts Movement is today. Since then, the org and SDAFF have consistently grown in size and recognition with each passing year.

Awards Presented

Lifetime Achievement Award 
This high honor has been given to Joan Chen, Kieu Chin, George Takei, Soon-Tek Oh, Nancy Kwan, Chung Chang-wha, Tyrus Wong and Wayne Wang.

George C. Lin Emerging Filmmaker Award 

Named for a founding member of the DC Asian Pacific American Film Festival who became Program Director of SDAFF  in 2003 until his untimely death after a long battle with cancer in 2008. The award is given to first time, new or otherwise emerging directors.

Past recipients of the award have included Andrew Ahn, Takeshi Fukunaga,  Patrick Wang and Nadine Truong among others.

Digital Pioneer Award 
Recipients have included Phil Yu, BuzzFeed Motion Pictures and Anna Akana.

Audience Award 
Recipients have included Island Soldier, Tyrus, Limited Partnership, American Revolutionary: The Evolution of Grace Lee Boggs and White on Rice, among others.

Annual Spring Showcase 
The Annual Spring Showcase, introduced in 2011 is a smaller festival than SDAFF, featuring around a dozen films each year.
Notable films
 2011 Little Big Soldier - inaugural opening night film
 2012 Sunny - opening night film
 2013 Linsanity - opening night film
 2014 To Be Takei - won the audience award at the 4th Annual Spring Showcase
 2015 In Football We Trust - opening night film
 2016 The Music of Strangers: Yo-Yo Ma and the Silk Road Ensemble - opening night film/audience award winner
 2017 Gook - closing night film
2018 Minding the Gap (Oscar Nominee) - official selection
2019 First Night Nerves (Stanley Kwan) - opening night film

Reel Voices
Each year since 2005, Pacific Arts Movement offers students from local San Diego schools the chance to join this 12-week film internship program. The program accepts around 10 students per year. Students are paired with a mentor and helped to compose a nonfiction documentary film by the Reel Voices staff and volunteers. The final product is screened at SDAFF where the students participate in a Q&A session after the showing.

In 2014, Reel Voices expanded programs to launch a media arts elective class at the Monarch School in San Diego's Barrio Logan for high school students interested in film production and digital storytelling.

Venues
Most of SDAFF's film screenings occur at the Hazard Center UltraStar Cinemas in Mission Valley, but some events have taken place at other locations such as UC San Diego, the Digital Gym Cinema in North Park and the Museum of Contemporary Art San Diego.

References

External links
 San Diego Asian Film Festival
Pacific Arts Movement
 SDAFF Award Winners
Spring Showcase History

Film festivals in San Diego
Asian-American film festivals
Asian-American organizations
Asian-American culture in San Diego
Non-profit organizations based in San Diego
Film festivals established in 2000
2000 establishments in California
Asian cinema